Semera may refer to:
Semera
Semera (state constituency), formerly represented in the Sarawak State Legislative Assembly (1969–1996)